The 2004 Portland Grand Prix was the fifth race for the 2004 American Le Mans Series season held at Portland International Raceway.  It took place on July 25, 2004.

Official results

Class winners in bold.  Cars failing to complete 70% of winner's distance marked as Not Classified (NC).

Statistics
 Pole Position - #20 Dyson Racing - 1:04.750
 Fastest Lap - #38 ADT Champion Racing - 1:05.129
 Distance - 
 Average Speed -

External links
 

P
Portland Grand Prix
Port
Portland Grand Prix